Architecture 101 (lit. Introduction to Architecture) is a 2012 South Korean romance film written and directed by Lee Yong-ju. The film tells the story of two students who meet in an introductory architecture class and fall in love. Fifteen years later, the girl tracks down her first love to seek his help in building her dream house.

Plot 
Seoul, the present day. Out of the blue, architect Lee Seung-min (Uhm Tae-woong) is approached by Yang Seo-yeon (Han Ga-in), whom he knew at college some 17 years previously, to design a new house for her on the site of her 30-year-old family home on Jeju island. Seung-min reluctantly agrees but can't come up with a design that pleases her. In the end, they decide to renovate and expand the existing house, and he and Seo-yeon spend a considerable amount of time together down in Jeju, to the growing annoyance of his fiancée Eun-chae (Go Joon-hee), with whom he is soon to be married and move to the US. As Seo-yeon cares for her dying father (Lee Seung-ho) and Seung-min learns more about what became of Seo-yeon in the intervening years, he recalls their initial meeting at college in the early 1990s.

Seung-min and Seo-yeon (Lee Je-hoon and Suzy) had lived in the same neighborhood (Jeongneung-dong, Seoul) and attended the same architecture class. He remembers her liking rich student Jae-wook (Yoo Yeon-seok), his inability to declare his attraction to her, and the times being coached by his best friend, Nab-ddeuk (Jo Jung-suk) in how to get girls. Hoping to confess his feelings to her at the perfect timing, Seung-min asks Seo-yeon to meet him at the abandoned house they frequent, on the first day that it snows that coming winter. But one night he catches Jae-wook and a drunk Seo-yeon entering her house together. Fearing the worst, he ends his friendship with Seo-yeon due to his pain of believing she had chosen Jae-wook. The first day of snow arrives, and Seo-yeon is left waiting in the abandoned house alone. Heartbroken, she leaves behind her portable CD player with a CD of her favorite artist.

Seo-yeon in the present day receives that very same CD player and CD from Seung-min, meaning that he actually went to the house later and remembered their promise. But despite the bitter-sweetness of their first love, in the end, Seung-min still chooses his fiancée Eun-chae and flies with her to America, while Seo-yeon sits in the house he built for her, listening to the CD.

Cast

Main
 Uhm Tae-woong as Lee Seung-min in the present
 Han Ga-in as Yang Seo-yeon in the present
 Lee Je-hoon as Lee Seung-min in the past
 Suzy as Yang Seo-yeon in the past

Supporting
 Yoo Yeon-seok as Jae-wook, Seo-yeon's sunbae and Seung-min's rival
 Jo Jung-suk as Nab-ddeuk, Seung-min's best friend
 Go Joon-hee as Eun-chae, Seung-min's fiancée
 Kim Dong-joo as Seung-min's mother
 Lee Seung-ho as Seo-yeon's father
 Kim Eui-sung as Professor Kang 
 Park Soo-young as Architect Koo
 Park Jin-woo as the taxi driver

Production 
Director Lee Yong-ju has a bachelor's degree in architecture from Yonsei University, and collaborated with architect Gu Seung-hoe to accurately depict the architectural details shown and mentioned in the film. The film was shot on location in the Seoul neighborhood of Jeong-neung and in Jeju Island.

It was chosen as the closing film at the 15th Shanghai International Film Festival.

In late August 2012, Typhoon Bolaven, regarded as the most powerful storm to strike the Korean Peninsula in nearly a decade, severely damaged Seo-yeon's house that was constructed especially for the movie. The house was rebuilt and renovated, designed by architect Gu Seung-hoe (executive consultant of construction for the film), with the interior design by Woo Seung-mie (the film's art director). It opened in March 2013 as a cafe, called Cafe Seo-yeon's House.

Music
The film reignited 1990s throwback fever among Koreans and made the fashion, music and celebrities of the period cool once again. Songs from the '90s, including duo Exhibition’s "Etude of Memory" were included on the score. Characters also use pagers, hair mousse, and portable CD players. The protagonist is even obsessed with GUESS T-shirts - counterfeits that were popular among Koreans in the 1990s. Nostalgia-inducing scenes that feature characters expressing awe at a one gigabyte hard drive computer or communicating with each other via landline telephones also brought the audience back in time.

And the movie’s impact on the present-day market was felt. Exhibition, the duo known as JeonRamHwe in Korea, saw a sudden increase in sales of its first EP, which was released in 1993, by 70 times in April compared to the previous month, with sales of the duo’s following EPs also on the rise. Yes 24 temporarily made a page on its official website that lists EPs from the 1990s alongside contemporary artists who are known to emulate the sentiments of the 1990s.

Release
Architecture 101 was released in South Korean theaters on March 22, 2012. It was subsequently released in Hong Kong on October 22, 2012.

Home video
On September 19, 2012, a two-disc limited edition DVD was released containing extra footage shot and edited by the director Lee Yong-ju, audio commentary by actors Uhm Tae-woong, Lee Je-hoon and Suzy, interviews and trailers, and a book containing pictures and production images from the set.

Among the deleted scenes are a flashback scene of Seung-min and Nab-ddeuk walking side by side; adult Seung-min taking a drunk Seo-yeon to her hotel room; and a longer, deeper kiss between Lee Je-hoon and Suzy. The scenes ended up on the cutting room floor because the director felt they did not fit the movie's tone.

Reception
The film captured viewers’ attention and earned critical plaudits with its restrained style and well drawn characters.

It held the No. 1 spot at the box office for three weeks after its release, attracting over 1 million viewers in only eight days, passing 2 million in seventeen days, and reaching 3 million on April 18. Male moviegoers are the backbone of the movie’s sales, an unusual path to success for a romantic drama. Critics have said that Architecture 101 especially resonates with the nostalgia men feel for their first loves.

It was one of the ten most-watched films in Korea in the first quarter of 2012 (No. 4 with 3.4 million tickets sold). 9 weeks after its theater release, it reached over 4.1 million admissions, a new box office record for Korean melodramas.

Awards and nominations

References

External links 
  
 
 
 
 
 

2012 films
South Korean romantic drama films
Films about architecture
Films set in the 1990s
Films set in the 2010s
Films set in Seoul
Films set in Jeju
Films shot in Seoul
Films shot in Jeju
Films directed by Lee Yong-ju
Myung Films films
Lotte Entertainment films
2010s Korean-language films
2012 romantic drama films
2010s South Korean films